The Fruitvale Oil Field is a large oil and gas field in the southern San Joaquin Valley, California, within and just northwest of the city of Bakersfield, along and north of the Kern River. It is one of the few oil fields in the California Central Valley which is mostly surrounded by a heavily populated area.

Setting

Unlike most of the large Kern County oil fields, which are in the hills bordering the Central Valley, the Fruitvale field is on the valley floor, surrounded by the city of Bakersfield and its suburbs.

The climate is arid, with hot summers and mild winters. Temperature in the summer commonly exceeds . Tule fog is common during the cooler months. Drainage is to the Kern River which flows southwest through the southern part of the field towards the Buena Vista Lake Bed.

While the native vegetation in the area is mostly allscale and needlegrass, most vegetation has been removed from the area of active operations, and formerly active areas have largely been converted to industrial or other urban uses.  Much of the northern part of the field, no longer used for production, is covered with residential development, as is the extreme south part, south of the Kern River.  In the northwestern area of the field, the Calloway Area, a decommissioned part of the field has been turned into a golf course.  Riparian vegetation and associated wildlife habitats can be found along the Kern River, which crosses through the southern part of the field.

Since the oil field is in an urbanized area, it is easily accessible from all sides.  California State Route 99, a freeway, runs along and through the east side of the field, and the Rosedale Highway, Route 58 runs across it from east to west.  Calloway Drive runs approximately along the western boundary, and Coffee Road parallels Calloway Drive to the east, crossing through the entire field.

Geology

The Fruitvale Field is in a sedimentary basin in which the beds dip slightly to the west. The topmost sedimentary unit, the Kern River Formation, is young – of Pleistocene age – and not oil-bearing. The most productive geologic formations, from top to bottom, include the Pliocene Etchegoin Formation, Pliocene-Miocene Chanac Formation, the Miocene 42-O Sand, and the Miocene Santa Margarita Formation. Many of these formations are productive oil-bearing units elsewhere in the Central Valley, for their geographic coverage is wide, and many structural and stratigraphic trap types exist throughout the province.

The field is divided conventionally into two significant areas: the large Main Area on the east and south, and the much smaller Calloway Area on the northwest.  At the west edge of the field is the small and abandoned Greenacres Area, which was marginally productive, between 1953 and 1969.

A total of five oil pools are distinguished within the Main Area. In order of discovery, they are the Mason-Parker, Martin, and Kernco (all February 1928), Santa Margarita (December 1929), and Fairhaven (March 1936). In the Calloway Area, two pools are identified but production data is commingled; they are named for their petroleum-bearing unit, the 42-0/42-7 Sand. This area was not discovered until 1957.

History, production and operations

Several enhanced recovery techniques have been used in the Fruitvale Field. In 1972, operators began waterflooding, thereby attempting to push the heavy crude to production wells, increasing the rate of extraction; in 1976, they began using cyclic steam flooding, a generally more effective technique for heavy oil, as the heat considerably reduces the oil's viscosity, helping it to flow. Engineers at the time believed that up to 400 million further barrels of oil could be recovered from the field, oil which could be made to flow due to the intense heat generated by this process.

In 2008, well operators on the field included none of the major oil companies.  The largest operators were independents such as Summit Energy, Big West of California, San Joaquin Facilities Management, E & B Natural Resources, Sunray Petroleum, Black Gold Oil Co., and others.  A total of 301 wells remained in production, and 65 were used for injection of various kinds (including steam and wastewater).

Production has generally declined since, although it leveled off around 1986, with approximately  pumped each year since then.

References
 California Oil and Gas Fields, Volumes I, II and III. Vol. I (1998), Vol. II (1992), Vol. III (1982). California Department of Conservation, Division of Oil, Gas, and Geothermal Resources (DOGGR). 1,472 pp. South Cuyama Oil Field information pp. 120-124. PDF file available on CD from www.consrv.ca.gov.
 California Department of Conservation, Oil and Gas Statistics, Annual Report, December 31, 2006.

Notes

Oil fields in Kern County, California
Oil fields in California
Urban oil fields